Marsac is the name or part of the name of several communes in France:

 Marsac, Charente
 Marsac, Creuse
 Marsac, Hautes-Pyrénées
 Marsac, Tarn-et-Garonne
 Marsac-en-Livradois
 Marsac-sur-Don
 Marsac-sur-l'Isle